Lambertella is a genus of fungi in the family Rutstroemiaceae.

The genus name of Lambertella is in honour of Lambert Gelbenegger (fl. 1917), an Austrian clergyman and botanist.

The genus was circumscribed by Franz Xaver Rudolf von Höhnel in Sitzungsber. Kaiserl. Akad. Wiss., Math.-Nat. Kl. Abt. Vol.1, on pages 127-375 in 1918.

Species

L. acuminata
L. agaricicola
L. aurantiaca
L. belisensis
L. berberidis
L. boliviana
L. bonahawensis
L. bouchetii
L. brevispora
L. brunneola
L. buchwaldii
L. carpatica
L. caudatoides
L. cephalanthi
L. chromoflava
L. colombiana
L. copticola
L. corni
L. corni-maris
L. cryptomeriae
L. crystallina
L. fuscotomentosa
L. fuscotomentosa
L. garryae
L. guizhouensis
L. hicoriae
L. himalayensis
L. indica
L. jasmini
L. kumaonica
L. kumaonica
L. langei
L. lasseri
L. latispora
L. makilingensis
L. malesiana
L. mexicana
L. microspora
L. mussooriensis
L. myricae
L. nainitalensis
L. nipponica
L. norvegica
L. obpyriformis
L. orientalis
L. pachysandrae
L. pallidispora
L. palmeri
L. phaeoparaphysata
L. pruni
L. pseudostriata
L. pyrolae
L. rhamnicola
L. rubi
L. spadiceoatra
L. subalpina
L. subrenispora
L. tengii
L. tetrica
L. tewarii
L. thindii
L. torquata
L. tropicalis
L. tubulosa
L. venezuelensis
L. verrucosispora
L. viburni
L. whetzelii
L. xishuangbanna
L. yunnanensis
L. zeylanica

References

Helotiales